The Embassy of Moldova (commonly referred to as the Moldovan Embassy) is a diplomatic mission in Israel located in Tel Aviv and is the chief diplomatic mission of Moldova in Israel. The embassy's role in Israel is to maintain and develop relations between Moldova and Israel.

The embassy promotes Moldova's security, prosperity and well-being, and regional peace, through partnership with Israel. The embassy deals with political, commercial, security and economic questions of interest to Moldova and Israel, and provides consular assistance to Moldovan nationals residing or traveling within Israel.

Diplomatic History

On December 25, 1991, Israel recognized the independence of the Republic of Moldova.
 On June 22, 1992, diplomatic relations were officially established between the Republic of Moldova and the State of Israel. On November 1, 1994, the first Embassy of the Republic of Moldova to the State of Israel was established in Tel Aviv, Israel at 38 Rembrandt Street.

Notable Former Ambassadors
On September 12, 1995, Ambassador Mr. Mihai Balan was appointed to Israel and served as the first Moldovan Ambassador.
On June 25, 2001, Ambassador Mr. Arthur Cozma was appointed to Israel and served as the second Moldovan Ambassador.
On January 6, 2006, Ambassador Mrs. Larisa Miculet was appointed to Israel and served as the third Moldovan Ambassador.
On December 23, 2011, Ambassador Mr. Mihai Balan was appointed to Israel and served as the fourth Moldovan Ambassador.
On August 7, 2013, Ambassador Anatol Vangheli was appointed to Israel and served as the fifth Moldovan Ambassador.

References

Diplomatic missions in Tel Aviv
Diplomatic missions of Moldova
Israel–Moldova relations